GWN may refer to:

 Global Wrestling Network
 Gowerton railway station, in Wales
 Great White North (disambiguation)
 Guild Wars Nightfall, a video game
 Gwandara language
 GWN7, a former Australian television network, formerly known as the Golden West Network
 Gwynedd, preserved county in Wales, Chapman code